The Faith/Void Split LP is a split album by Washington D.C. hardcore groups Void and the Faith, released on Dischord Records in 1982. Void was one of the earliest examples of hardcore/metal crossover with their chaotic musical approach cited as particularly influential. Kurt Cobain listed the album in his top fifty albums of all time.

Background and influence 

The Faith and Void were hardcore bands from Washington D.C., both with few releases (this is Void's only release throughout the band's existence), but a relatively large underground following among punk and hardcore punk fans.  Both bands were connected to Dischord Records, the punk label run by Ian MacKaye and Jeff Nelson of Minor Threat and were considered pioneers of DC Hardcore.

Writing for the Guardian, Craig Finn  of the Hold Steady referred to the split as “one of the most vital hardcore records ever released” and continued: “It's a reminder of hardcore at its finest: angry and dangerous without being cartoonish”.  This sentiment is popular among fans, with other publications calling the split: one of the greatest hardcore records ever put to wax, or the Void side of the split: “probably the most influential on the punk-thrash scene of the 90's”.

Distribution 
The record was number 8 in the Dischord catalog, indicating it was the label's 8th release.  Originally, the record was available in a test pressing with a handmade sleeve, followed by a regular pressing in cardboard sleeve with two lyrics inserts, one per band, both made in 1982.  Dischord has since remastered the album and re-released it twice - in 2008 in clear purple vinyl, and in 2011, in black vinyl.

Packaging 
The sleeve art for the LP (which dedicates one side to each of the bands on the original vinyl) is also rather iconic.

Track listing

The Faith
 "It's Time"
 "Face to Face"
 "Trapped"
 "In Control"
 "Another Victim"
 "What's Wrong with Me?"
 "What You Think"
 "Confusion"
 "You're X'd"
 "Nightmare"
 "Don't Tell Me"
 "In the Black"

Void
 "Who Are You?"
 "Time to Die"
 "Condensed Flesh"
 "Ignorant People"
 "Change Places"
 "Ask Them Why"
 "Organized Sports"
 "My Rules"
 "Self Defense"
 "War Hero"
 "Think"
 "Explode"

Re-issue 
Dischord re-issued the album on compact disc in November 1993, with the following extra tracks (from the Faith's Subject to Change EP). The disc was remastered at Silver Sonya in 2002 and subsequently re-released.

 Aware
 Say No More
 Limitations
 No Choice
 Untitled
 Subject to Change
 More of the Shame
 Slowdown

Personnel 
Faith/Void personnel as listed in the album liner notes.

 Void
 John Weiffenbach – vocals
 Jon "Bubba" Dupree – guitars, cover [Void]
 Chris Stover – bass
 Sean Finnegan – drums

 Faith
 Alec MacKaye – vocals
 Michael Hampton – guitars 
 Chris "Bald" Kirschten – bass, backing vocals
 Ivor Hanson – drums 

 Production 
 Void – production [Void], artwork [Void]
 Faith – production [Faith], mixing [Faith]
 Ian MacKaye – production (all tracks), mixing [Faith], backing vocals [Faith]
 Jeff Nelson – production (all tracks), mixing [Faith], backing vocals [Faith]
 Bert Queiroz – production [Void]
 Don Zientara – production (all tracks), mixing [Faith], sound engineer
 Malcom Riviera – photography [Faith cover] 
 Tiffany Pruitt – photography [Faith poster photos]

References

1982 albums
Void (band) albums
The Faith (American band) albums
Split albums